Samandere can refer to:

 Samandere, Düzce
 Samandere Waterfall